Two-Fisted Jones is a 1925 American silent Western film directed by Edward Sedgwick and written by Scott Darling. The film stars Jack Hoxie, Kathryn McGuire, William Steele, Harry Todd, Frank Rice, and Paul Grimes. The film was released on December 6, 1925, by Universal Pictures.

Plot
As described in a film magazine review, Jack Wilbur, hunting a man supposed to be lost, learns of a money lender Bart Wilson’s plot to steal Mary Mortimer’s ranch. The money lender hires a gang of cattle rustlers to steal the young woman’s cattle. The young man ruins this rustling plot. A man who has been identified as the missing person is being married to the young woman when Jack rides up and proves that he himself is the missing man. There is then a new bridegroom for the wedding ceremony.

Cast

References

External links

Still at silenthollywood.com

1925 films
1920s English-language films
1925 Western (genre) films
Universal Pictures films
Films directed by Edward Sedgwick
American black-and-white films
Silent American Western (genre) films
1920s American films